The Buddhāvataṃsaka-nāma-mahā­vaipulya-sūtra (The Mahāvaipulya Sūtra named “Buddhāvataṃsaka”) is one of the most influential Mahāyāna sutras of East Asian Buddhism. In Classical Sanskrit, avataṃsaka means garland, wreath, or any circular ornament, such as an earring. Thus, the title may be rendered in English as A Garland of Buddhas, Buddha Ornaments, or Buddha’s Garland. In Buddhist Hybrid Sanskrit, the term avataṃsaka means “a great number,” “a multitude,” or “a collection.” This is matched by the Tibetan title of the sutra, which is A Multitude of Buddhas ("").

Modern scholars consider the Buddhāvataṃsaka to be a compilation of numerous smaller sutras, many of which originally circulated independently and then were later brought together into the larger mature Buddhāvataṃsaka. Many of these independent Buddhāvataṃsaka sutras survive in Chinese translation. 

The text has been described by the translator Thomas Cleary "the most grandiose, the most comprehensive, and the most beautifully arrayed of the Buddhist scriptures." The Buddhāvataṃsaka describes a cosmos of infinite realms upon realms filled with an immeasurable number of Buddhas. This sutra was especially influential in East Asian Buddhism. The vision expressed in this work was the foundation for the creation of the Huayan school of Chinese Buddhism, which was characterized by a philosophy of interpenetration. The Huayan school is known as Hwaeom in Korea and Kegon in Japan. The sutra is also influential in Chan Buddhism.

Title
This work has been used in a variety of countries. Some major traditional titles include the following:
 Sanskrit: , The Mahāvaipulya Sūtra named “Buddhāvataṃsaka”. Vaipulya ("extensive") refers to key Mahayana sutras. "Garland/wreath/adornment" refers to a manifestation of the beauty of Buddha's virtues or his inspiring glory. The term avataṃsaka also means “a great number,” “a multitude,” or “a collection.” This matches the content of the sutra, in which numerous Buddhas are depicted as manifestations of the cosmic Buddha Vairocana. 
 Chinese: Dàfāngguǎng Fóhuāyán Jīng , commonly known as the Huāyán Jīng, meaning "Flower-adorned (Splendid & Solemn) Sūtra." Vaipulya here is translated as "corrective and expansive", fāngguǎng. Huā means at once "flower" (archaic; namely ) and "magnificence." Yán, short for zhuàngyán, means "to decorate (so that it is solemn, dignified)."
This title is identical to Chinese above, just in Shinjitai characters.
 , Standard Tibetan 
 Tangut (romanized): Tha cha wa tha fa sho ldwi rye

History 
The Buddhāvataṃsakasūtra was written in stages, beginning from at least 500 years after the death of the Buddha. One source claims that it is "a very long text composed of a number of originally independent scriptures of diverse provenance, all of which were combined, probably in Central Asia, in the late third or the fourth century CE." Japanese scholars such as Akira Hirakawa and Otake Susumu meanwhile argue that the Sanskrit original was compiled in India from sutras already in circulation which also bore the name "Buddhavatamsaka".

Two full Chinese translations of the Buddhāvataṃsakasūtra were made. Fragmentary translation probably began in the 2nd century CE, and the famous Ten Stages Sutra, often treated as an individual scripture, was first translated in the 3rd century. The first complete Chinese version was translated by Buddhabhadra around 420 in 60 scrolls with 34 chapters, and the second by Śikṣānanda around 699 in 80 scrolls with 40 chapters. There is also a translation of the Gaṇḍavyūha section by Prajñā around 798. The second translation includes more sutras than the first, and the Tibetan translation, which is still later, includes many differences with the 80 scrolls version. Scholars conclude that sutras were being added to the collection.

The single extant Tibetan version was translated from the original Sanskrit by Jinamitra et al. at the end of ninth century.

According to Paramārtha, a 6th-century monk from Ujjain in central India, the Buddhāvataṃsakasūtra is also called the "Bodhisattva Piṭaka." In his translation of the Mahāyānasaṃgrahabhāṣya, there is a reference to the Bodhisattva Piṭaka, which Paramārtha notes is the same as the Avataṃsaka Sūtra in 100,000 lines. Identification of the Buddhāvataṃsakasūtra as a "Bodhisattva Piṭaka" was also recorded in the colophon of a Chinese manuscript at the Mogao Caves: "Explication of the Ten Stages, entitled Creator of the Wisdom of an Omniscient Being by Degrees, a chapter of the Mahāyāna sūtra Bodhisattvapiṭaka Buddhāvataṃsaka, has ended."

Overview 

The sutra, among the longest Buddhist sutras, is a compilation of disparate texts on various topics such as the Bodhisattva path, the interpenetration of phenomena (dharmas), the omnipresence of Buddhahood, the miraculous powers of the Buddhas and bodhisattvas, the visionary powers of meditation, and the equality of things in emptiness.

According to Paul Demiéville, the Buddhāvataṃsaka collection is "characterized by overflowing visionary images, which multiply everything to infinity, by a type of monadology that teaches the interpenetration of the one whole and the particularized many, of spirit and matter" and by "the notion of a gradual progress towards liberation through successive stages and an obsessive preference for images of light and radiance." Likewise, Alan Fox has described the sutra's worldview as "fractal", "holographic", and "psychedelic".

The East Asian view of the text is that it expresses the universe as seen by a Buddha (the Dharmadhatu), who sees all phenomena as empty and thus infinitely interpenetrating, from the point of view of enlightenment. This interpenetration is described in the Buddhāvataṃsakasūtra as the perception "that the fields full of assemblies, the beings and aeons which are as many as all the dust particles, are all present in every particle of dust." Thus, a Buddha's view of reality is also said to be "inconceivable; no sentient being can fathom it". 

Paul Williams notes that the sutra speaks of both Yogacara and Madhyamaka doctrines, stating that all things are empty of inherent existence and also of a "pure untainted awareness or consciousness (amala-citta) as the ground of all phenomena". The Buddhāvataṃsakasūtra also highlights the visionary and mystical power of attaining the spiritual wisdom which sees the nature of the world:

Endless action arises from the mind; from action arises the multifarious world. Having understood that the world's true nature is mind, you display bodies of your own in harmony with the world. Having realized that this world is like a dream, and that all Buddhas are like mere reflections, that all principles [dharma] are like an echo, you move unimpeded in the world (Trans in Gomez, 1967: lxxxi)

As a result of their meditative power, Omnipotence Buddhas have the magical ability to create and manifest infinite forms, and they do this in many skillful ways out of great compassion for all beings.

In all atoms of all lands
Buddha enters, each and every one,
Producing miracle displays for sentient beings:
Such is the way of Vairocana....
The techniques of the Buddhas are inconceivable,
All appearing in accord with beings’ minds....
In each atom the Buddhas of all times
Appear, according to inclinations;
While their essential nature neither comes nor goes,
By their vow power they pervade the worlds.(Cleary 1984–7: I, Bk 4)

The point of these teachings is to lead all beings through the ten bodhisattva levels to the goal of Buddhahood (which is done for sake of all other beings). These stages of spiritual attainment are also widely discussed in various parts of the sutra (book 15, book 26). 

The sutra also includes unspeakable Buddhas and their untold Buddhalands which are said to be infinite, representing a vast cosmic view of reality, though it centers on a most important figure, the Buddha Mahavairocana ("Great Radiance" or "The Great Illuminator"). Vairocana is a supreme cosmic buddha who is the source of light and enlightenment of the 'Lotus universe', and who is said to contain all world systems within his entire cosmic body. According to Paul Williams, the Buddha "is said or implied at various places in this vast and heterogeneous sutra to be the universe itself, to be the same as ‘absence of intrinsic existence’ or emptiness, and to be the Buddha's all-pervading omniscient awareness." The very body of Vairocana is also seen as a reflection of the whole universe:

The body of [Vairocana] Buddha is inconceivable. In his body are all sorts of lands of sentient beings. Even in a single pore are countless,immeasurable vast oceans.

Also, for the Buddhāvataṃsakasūtra, the historical Buddha Sakyamuni is simply a magical emanation of the cosmic Buddha Vairocana.

Chapter overview

Luis Gomez notes that there is an underlying order to the collection. The discourses in the sutra version with 39 chapters or books are delivered to eight different audiences or "assemblies" in seven locations such as Bodh Gaya and the Tusita Heaven. Each "assembly" includes various locales, doctrinal topics and characters. The main "assemblies" which the collection is traditionally divided into are:

At the Bodhimaṇḍa (Books 1–5) 
In this assembly at the Bodhimaṇḍa (the seat of awakening under the bodhi tree), the bodhisattva Samantabhadra and the Buddha discuss the nature of reality and how Vairocana Buddha is omnipresent throughout the dharmadhātu.

The Hall of Universal Light (Books 6–12) 
The bodhisattva Mañjuśrī asks the Buddha about the various ways that the four noble truths (which are the basis of all bodhisattva practice) are taught. The bodhisattva Bhadramukha also teaches the Bodhisattva Path.

Indra's Palace (Books 13–18) 
The Buddha teaches in Trāyastriṃśa Heaven at the Palace of Indra. Dharmamati teaches on how the bodhisattva path progresses in ten abodes or viharas.

Yama's Palace (Books 19–22) 
The Buddha teaches on how the world is a mental creation and provides the famous simile of the world being like a painting and the mind being the painter. The bodhisattva Gunavana teaches the ten practices (carya) of bodhisattvas and the ten inexhaustible treasuries.

Tusita Heaven (Books 23–25) 
Vajradhvaja teaches the ways that bodhisattvas dedicate and transfer their merit.

Paranirmitavasavartin Heaven (Book 26) 
This is the Ten Stages Sutra (Daśabhūmika sutra), which focuses on the ten bhūmis (levels or stages) of the bodhisattva path.

The Hall of Universal Light part 2 (Books 27–38) 
The Buddha returns to the hall of universal light and Samantabhadra teaches the ten samadhis, supernormal powers, and ten types of patience (kshanti). Various other teachings on the bodhisattva path are given, which recapitulate the themes covered in the previous books. The immeasurability of Buddhahood is discussed and Samantabhadra is said to embody all the activities of the omnipresent Buddhahood.

Jetavana Pavillion (Book 39) 
This is the Gaṇḍavyūha Sūtra, which contains the story of the bodhisattva Sudhana's spiritual career, study under numerous teachers and his inconceivable liberation.

Individual sutras 
Various "chapters" of the Buddhāvataṃsaka collection also circulated as individual sutras. These include the Ten Stages Sutra, the Flower Array Sutra and the Manifestation of the Tathagatha sutra. The first two of these sutras have also survived individually in the original Sanskrit (while the rest of the Avatamsaka only survives in translation).

Ten Stages Sutra 

This sutra gives details on the ten stages (bhūmis) of development a bodhisattva must undergo to attain supreme enlightenment. The ten stages are also depicted in the Laṅkāvatāra Sūtra and the Śūraṅgama Sūtra. The sutra also touches on the subject of the development of the "aspiration for Enlightenment" (bodhicitta) to attain supreme buddhahood.

The Flower Array Sutra 

The last chapter of the Avatamsaka circulates as a separate and important text known as the Gaṇḍavyūha Sutra ("", or "bouquet";  ‘Entering the Dharma Realm’). Considered the "climax" of the larger text, this section details the pilgrimage of the layman Sudhana to various lands (worldly and supra-mundane) at the behest of the bodhisattva Mañjuśrī to find a spiritual friend who will instruct him in the ways of a bodhisattva. According to Luis Gomez, this sutra can also be "regarded as emblematic of the whole collection."

Despite the former being at the end of the Avataṃsaka, the Gaṇḍavyūha and the Ten Stages are generally believed to be the oldest written chapters of the sutra.

The Manifestation of the Tathagatha sutra 
The Tathāgatotpattisaṃbhavasūtra (The Manifestation of the Tathagatha sutra), which corresponds to chapter 32 of the full Buddhāvataṃsaka translation of Buddhabhadra (Taisho Tripitaka no. 278), focuses on the nature of the Buddha (Tathāgata) and his activities. According to Imre Hamar, this sutra "is a precursor to the tathāgatagarbha theory, the idea of universal access to buddhahood, as it stresses that all living beings have the wisdom of the Buddha, but due to their defilements, they are not able to see it. The Buddha’s mission is to reveal this fact to living beings." 

A version of this text was also translated into Chinese by Dharmarakṣa in 292 CE as an independent sutra, the Fo shuo rulai xingxian jing (佛說如來興顯經; The Appearance of Tathāgata as Related by the Buddha; *Tathāgatotapattisaṃbhavanirdeśa).

English translations
The first relatively complete English translation of the contents of the Buddhāvataṃsakasūtra was authored by the late Thomas Cleary and published by Shambhala Publications in 1984 as The Flower Ornament Scripture: A Translation of the Avatamsaka Sūtra. Cleary's translation was actually only partially translated from Śikṣānanda's most complete and now standard Tang Dynasty edition. Cleary chose instead to translate fully a third of this scripture (the very long and detailed Chapter 26 and the immense 53-part Chapter 39) from the much later P.L. Vaidya Sanskrit editions, even though he claimed on page two of his introduction to have made his translation from the Śikṣānanda edition. This is clearly not true, for Cleary's translations of Chapters 26 and 39 do not follow Śikṣānanda's Chinese at all, whereas they do follow the often very different P.L. Vaidya Sanskrit edition fairly closely from beginning to end.  

Bhiksu Dharmamitra has recently produced from Tripitaka Master Śikṣānanda's 699 ce Sanskrit-to-Chinese edition (T0279) the first and so far only complete English translation of any edition of the Buddhāvataṃsakasūtra. It is published by Kalavinka Press in three volumes (totaling 2,500 pages) as The Flower Adornment Sutra: An Annotated Translation of the Avataṃsaka Sutra with A Commentarial Synopsis of the Flower Adornment Sutra (October 1st, 2022 / ISBNS: Volume One - 9781935413356; Volume Two - 9781935413363; Volume Three - 9781935413370). (His complete translation of Chapter 39 which corresponds precisely to the Gaṇḍa­vyūha is contained in Volume Three of this work. It includes the traditionally appended conclusion to Chapter 39, "The Conduct and Vows of Samantabhadra" which was originally translated into Chinese in 798 ce by Tripitaka Master Prajñā). 

Kalavinka Press also published the Daśabhūmika Sūtra (corresponding to Chapter 26 of the ) as an independent text as: The Ten Grounds Sutra: The Daśabhūmika Sūtra: the Ten Highest Levels of Practice on the Bodhisattva's Path to Buddhahood (2019). This was translated by Bhikshu Dharmamitra from Tripitaka Master Kumārajīva’s circa 410 ce Sanskrit-to-Chinese translation of the Daśabhūmika Sūtra (T0286).

The publisher Bukkyo Dendo Kyokai (BDK) has finished editing and is currently (as of July, 2022) in the process of preparing for publication an unannotated multi-volume edition of Bhikshu Dharmamitra's Flower Adornment Sutra which also includes Bhikshu Dharmamitra's translation of the traditionally appended conclusion to Chapter 39, "The Conduct and Vows of Samantabhadra" originally translated by Tripitaka Master Prajñā.

Both the Gaṇḍa­vyūha and the Daśabhūmika (which together constitute approximately one third of the ) have been independently translated from the Tibetan version by Peter Alan Roberts along with 84000.co as:

 The Ten Bhūmis Chapter from the Mahāvaipulya Sūtra “A Multitude of Buddhas” 
 “The Stem Array” Chapter from the Mahāvaipulya Sūtra “A Multitude of Buddhas”  

These translations are freely available on the 84000 website.

Currently over twenty volumes are available, and it is estimated that there may be 75-100 volumes in the complete edition.

See also
 Indra's net
 List of sutras
 Mahayana sutras
 Shin'yaku Kegonkyō Ongi Shiki, an early Japanese annotation
 Huayan school, named after this sutra
 Kegon school, Japanese Huayan
 Multiverse

References

Further reading

Prince, Tony (2020), Universal Enlightenment - An introduction to the Teachings and Practices of Huayen Buddhism (2nd ed.)  Amazon Kindle Book, ASIN: B08C37PG7G

External links

The Avatamsaka Sutra (the Flower Adornment Sutra) with explanation
Introducing the Avatamsaka Sutra - an outline of the sutra by a disciple of Master Hsuan Hua
Articles by Imre Hamar
大方廣佛華嚴經 Avataṃsakasūtra Chinese text with matching English vocabulary at NTI Reader digital library

Huayan
Mahayana sutras
Vaipulya sutras
Yogacara